Thin Ice is a 2020 television series set in Greenland and the Icelandic seas. A co-production between Icelandic, French and Swedish companies the first season was broadcast in 2020.

An attack on a Swedish oil exploration vessel and the disappearance of its crew takes intelligence officer Liv Hermanson to the Greenland village of Tasiilaq to investigate. The cast includes Davíð Guðbrandsson, Lena Endre, Bianca Kronlöf and Guðjón Ragnarsson.

References

External links

2020 Swedish television series debuts
Swedish crime television series
Swedish drama television series
Television shows filmed in Greenland
Greenland